Orara River, a perennial stream of the Clarence River catchment, is located in the Northern Rivers district of New South Wales, Australia.

Course and features
Orara River rises on the eastern slopes of the Dorrigo Plateau, Great Dividing Range, east of Dorrigo and west of Boambee, and flows in a meandering course generally north east north and north-west, joined by six tributaries including Urumbilum River and Kangaroo River, before reaching its confluence with the Clarence River, southeast of Copmanhurst. The river descends  over its  course; and flows through the Dorrigo National Park in its upper reaches.

Major communities along the river include Coramba, Nana Glen, Glenreagh, Coutts Crossing, Ramornie, and Eatonville.

In recent years, the river has suffered from overuse, particularly due to irrigation projects and the river's use as the major source of water for the city of Coffs Harbour. This has led to siltation in the river, and the virtual decimation of the river's freshwater fish stocks.

The name of the river is believed to be derived from Urara, an Aboriginal phrase meaning "where the perch live".

See also

 Rivers of New South Wales

References

External links
 Minister congratulates Rivercare winner
 Flood of the Century Unites Community

 

Rivers of New South Wales
Northern Rivers